Sarah Jane Thomas (born 5 June 1952) is a British actress, born in London, best known for her television appearances as Enid Simmons in Worzel Gummidge (1980), and as Glenda Wilkinson in Last of the Summer Wine (1986–2010).

Career

Sarah Thomas began her television career with an episode of the drama Special Branch in 1970. Other TV appearances include Within These Walls (1974–75), The Velvet Glove (1977), Together (1980), Worzel Gummidge (1979–81), in which she played the recurring role of Enid,  The Black Adder (1983), Miracles Take Longer (1984), Shroud for a Nightingale (1984), and Happy Families (1985).

In 1985 she joined the cast of the internationally successful BBC television sitcom Last of the Summer Wine as Glenda, the daughter of Thora Hird's character. She stayed with the series for 25 years, until it came to an end in 2010.

Her most recent television guest star roles were in episodes of Heartbeat, The Bill and Doctors.

In theatre she has starred in many productions, most notably as Mrs. Danvers in Rebecca and as Miss Marple in Agatha Christie's A Murder is Announced.

Filmography

Pantomime appearances 
In December 2007, Thomas starred in Cinderella at the Assembly Hall Theatre, Tunbridge Wells as the Fairy Godmother, appearing with Tom Vaughan, from Hollyoaks, and Barney Harwood.  In 2008/09, she again starred as the Fairy Godmother in Cinderella, but this time at the Grand Theatre in Swansea, alongside Su Pollard and Chris Jarvis.

From December 2009 to January 2010 she appeared in Jack and the Beanstalk at the Malvern Theatre, alongside Mike Fischetti and Colin Baker.

References

External links 
 
 Profile at SuperiorPics.com (good career résumé, but incorrect picture)
 Article in Thurrock Gazette (includes picture)

1952 births
Living people
English stage actresses
English television actresses
British comedy actresses